{{Taxobox
| name = Chiloglanis sp. nov. 'Kerio| image = 
| status = DD | status_system = IUCN3.1
| regnum = Animalia
| phylum = Chordata
| classis = Actinopterygii
| ordo = Siluriformes
| familia = Mochokidae
| genus = Chiloglanis
| species = C. sp. nov. 'Kerio'| binomial = Chiloglanis sp. nov. 'Kerio| binomial_authority = 
| synonyms = 
}}Chiloglanis sp. nov. 'Kerio' is a species of fish in the family Mochokidae. It is endemic to Kenya.  Its natural habitat is rivers.

Sources 

Undescribed vertebrate species
sp. nov. 'Kerio'
Endemic freshwater fish of Kenya
Taxonomy articles created by Polbot
Taxobox binomials not recognized by IUCN